The Barbara Jordan-Mickey Leland School of Public Affairs, also referred to as BJMLSPA, is the public policy school within Texas Southern University (TSU) in Houston, Texas, United States. For students interested in formulating and shaping public policy, the School offers many opportunities for learning, research, professional development, community partnerships, and public engagement. Located in Houston, the nation's fourth largest city, the BJMLSPA offers opportunities for students to study, observe, and interact with policymakers and decision makers, test new ideas, develop new models, and implement solution-driven strategies.

Departments & centers
The Barbara Jordan-Mickey Leland School of Public Affairs offers instruction, research and professional services through three departments in Political Science (POLS), Administration of Justice (AJ) and Urban Planning and Environmental Policy (UPEP). The Department of Political Science (POLS) offers undergraduate degrees in public affairs, political science and emergency management and homeland security, as well as, a Masters and an Executive Masters of public administration. The Department of Administration of Justice (AJ) offers an undergraduate degree in administration of justice, a Masters and an Executive Masters of Administration of Justice and a Ph.D. in Administration of Justice. The Department of Urban Planning and Environmental Policy (UPEP) offers instructional services through two graduate degree programs, the Masters and Doctor of Philosophy (PhD) in UPEP.  The Department of Urban Planning and Environmental Policy (UPEP) also offers a dual Masters in Urban Planning and Environmental Policy/Juris Doctor (JD) with the Thurgood Marshall School of Law at Texas Southern University.

Centers & programs
The Barbara Jordan-Mickey Leland School of Public Affairs has 3 centers
 Forensic Science training Center
 Barbara Jordan Institute
 Mickey Leland Center 
 Digital Scholarship @ Texas Southern University - The School of Public Affairs has a scholarly presence on the most acclaimed open access site Digital Commons joining over 360 institutions of higher education. From the schools community, departments, faculty, and students have the opportunity to promote and publish their scholarship. Additionally, the School of Public Affairs hosts three peer reviewed journals.

Notable alumni
 Barbara Jordan
 Rodney Ellis
 Musiliu Obanikoro
 Carl S. Richie, Jr-Vice President Government Affairs TXU Energy
 Deborah E. King, Ph.D - President of DEBLAR & Associates, Inc
 Antoinette Samuel - Executive Director of the American Society for Public Administration (ASPA)
 Clarence Bradford
 Bruce A. Austin
 John L. Guess,III - President of The Guess Group,Inc

See also
Texas Southern University

References

External links
 
  Texas Southern University - Special Collections

Texas Southern University